Matveyevka is a rural locality (a village) in Pervomaysky Selsoviet, Sterlitamaksky District, Bashkortostan, Russia. The population was 206 as of 2010. There are four streets.

Geography 
Matveyevka is located 23 km southwest of Sterlitamak (the district's administrative centre) by road.

References 

Rural localities in Sterlitamaksky District